Lesson One （）is the debut studio album released by the Taiwanese singer-songwriter, Anthony Neely, on 19 November 2010 with 11 tracks， The lead single, "Sorry That I Loved You" and the second single, "The Last Embrace" received commercial successes.

Tracklisting 
CD

Editions 

Lesson One (Pre-order)(CD+DVD)
With DVD

Lesson One (Standard Version)(CD)

Awards

References 

Anthony Neely albums
2010 debut albums